Jonathan Jäger (born 23 May 1978) is a French former professional footballer who played as a striker.

Career
Jäger joined Freiburg from 1. FC Saarbrücken in 2007, after finishing as joint top-scorer in the Regionalliga Süd (III) for the season.

References

External links
 
 
 

1978 births
Living people
Footballers from Metz
Association football forwards
French footballers
Ligue 1 players
Ligue 2 players
Bundesliga players
2. Bundesliga players
FC Metz players
Louhans-Cuiseaux FC players
Le Havre AC players
1. FC Saarbrücken players
SC Freiburg players
F91 Dudelange players
CSO Amnéville players
French expatriate footballers
French expatriate sportspeople in Germany
Expatriate footballers in Germany
French expatriate sportspeople in Luxembourg
Expatriate footballers in Luxembourg
French people of German descent